Youth Novels is the debut studio album by Swedish singer and songwriter Lykke Li, released on 30 January 2008 on her own label, the EMI-distributed LL Recordings. The album was entirely produced by Björn Yttling of Swedish indie pop band Peter Bjorn and John and co-produced by Lasse Mårtén. Youth Novels spawned four singles: "Little Bit", "I'm Good, I'm Gone", "Breaking It Up" and "Tonight".

Critical reception

Youth Novels received generally positive reviews from music critics. At Metacritic, which assigns a normalised rating out of 100 to reviews from mainstream publications, the album received an average score of 75, based on 27 reviews. Alex Denney of Drowned in Sound praised the album as "a twinkle-toed debut that dares to suggest what others can only make tediously plain, and leaves us in the rarely-enjoyed position of actually wanting more." PopMatters's Adrien Begrand called it "extraordinary" and described it as "a surprisingly stark-sounding album, an enticing blend of Robyn's unpretentious dance-pop and El Perro del Mar's introspection and tenderness." The Times critic Tom Gatti noted that Yttling gave Youth Novels the same treatment as to Peter Bjorn and John's song "Young Folks", stating that he "[weaves] Lykke Li's girlish, wistful songs of young love and loss into bright pocket symphonies."

In a review for The A.V. Club, Vadim Rizov characterised Youth Novels as "all teasing and heartbreak, with production [...] that plays on empty spaces as much as well-chosen backing", commending Li for "adeptly [straddling] the line between instant gratification and minimalist smarts." Killian Fox of The Observer commented that "[t]he coquettish charm of [Li's] voice, tinged with shyness, is brilliantly offset by Björn Yttling's skeletal productions, which create great pop momentum out of the slightest effects", concluding, "The lyrics lack focus at times but this is a winning debut." Greg Cochrane of NME called the album "[s]imple but sensational". K. Ross Hoffman of AllMusic wrote, "Brimming with ideas but understated, even tentative in executing them, and big on hooks but nervously intimate in presentation, Youth Novels is a curious, decidedly unorthodox but endearing record."

Joe Gross of Spin stated that "[Li's] voice is mousy, the low end juicy, the melodies sketchy, the choruses huge", but found that "[s]he should lose the spoken-word bits, though; they don't even work for her goddess Madonna." Tom Ewing of Pitchfork expressed, "At its frequent best, the record manages to sketch out widescreen hit songs with a remarkable economy of means. At its more occasional worst, the tracks feel frustratingly underthought." Will Hermes of Rolling Stone felt that Li's "frosty squeak is a limited instrument, but she works it, mixing adorable playground scats with spoken-word whispers and parched coos that barely sketch her sugary melodies. The arrangements also dress simple tunes in surprising ways, with odd choral bits and percolating percussion webs that should tease movement from even reluctant hips." The Guardians Maddy Costa opined that the song "Tonight" "shows what she is capable of: underscored by a melancholy piano, she is darkly seductive", but "[a]fter that has passed, the album just gets increasingly cloying."

Accolades
Youth Novels earned Li five nominations for the 2009 Swedish Grammis, including Album of the Year, Female Artist of the Year, Live Act of the Year, Composer of the Year (with Yttling) and Lyricist of the Year. The same year, she won the P3 Guld award for Newcomer of the Year and was nominated for Pop Artist of the Year.

Commercial performance
In Li's native Sweden, Youth Novels debuted and peaked at number three on the Swedish Albums Chart for the week of 7 February 2008, behind Johnny Logan & Friends' The Irish Connection and Van Morrison's Still on Top – The Greatest Hits. It spent 20 non-consecutive weeks altogether on the chart, including four re-entries in 2008 and one on 30 January 2009. The album charted for a sole week in both the United Kingdom and Ireland, reaching numbers 112 and 75, respectively.

In continental Europe, Youth Novels reached number 36 in Norway, number 56 in Belgium, number 75 in the Netherlands and number 143 in France. It also peaked at number 18 on Billboards Top Heatseekers in the United States, and at number seven on the ARIA Hitseekers chart in Australia. As of April 2014, the album had sold 106,000 copies in the United States.

Track listing

Personnel
Credits adapted from the liner notes of Youth Novels.

Musicians

 Lykke Li – vocals
 Björn Yttling – piano ; synthesizer ; acoustic guitar ; celeste ; vibraphone ; backing vocals ; snare ; electric bass ; percussion ; drums ; harpsichord ; string arrangement ; keyboards, mandolin ; foot stomp ; rocksichord 
 Walter Sear – theremin 
 Per "Ruskträsk" Johansson – saxophone ; flute 
 John Eriksson – percussion ; drums ; cymbal ; Mellotron 
 Lars Skoglund – drums ; percussion ; hi-hat 
 Mapei – backing vocals 
 Lissy Trullie – backing vocals 
 Johan "Zilverzurfarn" Zachrisson – acoustic guitar, foot stomp 
 Dylan Von Wagner – backing vocals 
 Peter Morén – backing vocals 
 Andreas Forsman – violin 
 Erik Arvinder – violin 
 Erik Holm – viola 
 Henrik Söderquist – cello 
 Markus Ollikainen – trumpet 
 Neil Lipuma – tambourine 
 The Suzan – backing vocals 
 Lasse Mårtén – percussion 

Technical

 Björn Yttling – production, recording, mixing
 Lasse Mårtén – co-production, recording, additional recordings, mixing
 Janne Hansson – recording
 Matt Azzarto – additional recordings
 Bil Emmons – additional recordings
 Tommy Andersson – engineering assistance
 Tom Gloady – engineering assistance
 Neil Lipuma – engineering assistance
 Henrik Jonsson – mastering

Artwork
 Sandberg&Timonen – artwork
 Marcus Palmqvist – photography

International edition
 Björn Yttling – electric bass, piano ; rocksichord, celeste, organ, percussion ; flute, trumpet 
 Lars Skoglund – cowbell ; drums 
 Per "Ruskträsk" Johansson – flute 
 John Eriksson – percussion

Charts

Weekly charts

Year-end charts

Release history

Notes

References

2008 debut albums
Albums produced by Björn Yttling
Atlantic Records albums
Lykke Li albums
European Border Breakers Award-winning albums